Eoagnostus is an extinct genus from a well-known class of fossil marine arthropods, the trilobites. It lived during the terminal Lower Cambrian (Toyonian), until the earliest Middle Cambrian (earliest Kounamkites-zone, part of the lower Amgaian).

Distribution 
 E. roddyi terminal Lower Cambrian of the United States (Bonnia-zone, Kinzers Shale, Lancaster, New York; Pennsylvania; Vermont) and the early Middle Cambrian of Newfoundland, and Greenland (around the boundary of Ovatoryctocara-zone, Henson Gletscher Formation).
 E. acrorhachis occurs in the terminal Lower Cambrian of the United States (Bonnia-zone, Hatch Hill, New York).

Description 
Almost identical to Archaeagnostus, but the frontal lobe of the central raised area of the cephalon (or glabella) is effaced, while the back of glabella is inflated.

References

Peronopsidae
Agnostida genera
Cambrian trilobites
Fossils of Greenland
Fossils of the United States